Namika La ("Pillar of the Sky Pass") is a high mountain pass in the Zaskar Range of the Himalayas in Ladakh, India, at an elevation of . It is traversed by the Srinagar-Leh highway.

Namika La is one of two high passes between Kargil and Leh. The other is the even higher Fotu La Pass.

The western approach to the pass is via the Wakha Rong valley, making a detour to a waterless branch valley of it above the village of Mulbekh. To the east of the pass is another branch valley (Saraks Lungpa) of the Sangeluma river valley in the vicinity of Bodh Karbu.

References

Mountain passes of Ladakh
Mountain passes of the Himalayas
Kargil district